Matilda Gjergji (born 21 May 2003) is an Albanian footballer who plays as a defender for Vllaznia and the Albania national team.

International career
Gjergji made her debut for the Albania national team on 25 November 2021, coming on as a substitute for Mimoza Hamidi against Norway.

Personal life
Gjergji cites fellow Vllaznia footballer Arbiona Bajraktari as an influence on her football career.

References

2003 births
Living people
Women's association football defenders
Albanian women's footballers
Albania women's international footballers
KFF Vllaznia Shkodër players
Footballers from Shkodër